Sixten Wackström (born 2 August 1960) is a Finnish former cyclist. He competed at the 1980 Summer Olympics and the 1984 Summer Olympics.

References

External links
 

1960 births
Living people
Finnish male cyclists
Olympic cyclists of Finland
Cyclists at the 1980 Summer Olympics
Cyclists at the 1984 Summer Olympics
People from Porvoo
Sportspeople from Uusimaa